Memories is the title of a studio album by American country music artist Doc Watson, released in 1975. It was originally released as a double-LP by United Artists Records. It peaked at No. 47 on Billboard Country Albums charts and No. 193 on the Pop Album charts.

Guy Clark included a reference to Watson and his performance of "Columbus Stockade Blues" in the lyrics in his song "Dublin Blues": "I have seen the David, seen the Mona Lisa too, and I have heard Doc Watson play Columbus Stockade Blues."

Sugar Hill re-issued Memories on CD in 1993. It has also been re-issued by Gott Discs.

Track listing
 "Rambling Hobo" (Doc Watson) – 1:55
 "Shady Grove" (Traditional) – 2:42
 "Wake Up, Little Maggie" (Gaither Carlton, Doc Watson) – 2:53
 "Peartree" (Gaither Carlton, Doc Watson) – 2:21
 "Keep on the Sunny Side" (A. P. Carter, Gary Garett) – 2:09
 "Double File and Salt Creek" (Traditional) – 1:42
 "Curly Headed Baby" (Lillian Leatherman, Lucille Leatherman) – 2:59
 "Miss the Mississippi and You" (Bill Halley) – 3:42
 "Wabash Cannonball" (A. P. Carter) – 3:03
 "My Rose of Old Kentucky" (Bill Monroe) – 2:40
 "Blues Stay Away from Me" (Alton Delmore, Rabon Delmore, Alton Glover, Wayne Raney) –  2:51
 "Walking Boss" – 2:24
 "Make Me a Pallet" (Joe Parrish) – 3:02
 "In the Jailhouse Now" (Jimmie Rodgers) – 3:30
 "Steel Guitar Rag" (Leon McAuliffe, Cliff Stone, Merle Travis) – 1:58
 "Hang Your Head in Shame" (Ed G. Nelson, Steve Nelson, Fred Rose) – 2:44
 "You Don't Know My Mind Blues" (Samuel H. Gray, Virginia Liston, Clarence Williams) – 3:11
 "Moody River" (Gary D. Bruce) – 2:36
 "Don't Tell Me Your Troubles" (Don Gibson) – 2:48
 "Columbus Stockade" (Jimmie Davis, Eva Sagent) – 3:18
 "Mama Don't Allow No Music" (Traditional) – 4:15
 "Thoughts of Never" (Merle Watson) – 2:38

Personnel
Doc Watson – guitar, harmonica, banjo, vocals
Merle Watson – guitar, banjo, dulcimer, slide guitar, steel guitar
Joe Allen – bass
Sam Bush – fiddle, mandolin, vocals, harmony vocals
Courtney Johnson – banjo
Jim Isbell – drums, percussion
Joe Smothers – guitar, harmony vocals
Chuck Cochran – bass, piano, organ
T. Michael Coleman – bass, background vocals
Production notes
Produced by Chuck Cochran
Mastering by Larry Boden
Re-mastering by Andrew Thompson
Photography by Jim McGuire
Design by Beverly Parker
Art direction by Bob Cato
Liner notes by Merle Travis and Chet Flippo
Engineering and mixing by Garth Fundis

References

1975 albums
Doc Watson albums
United Artists Records albums